Salisbury Island may refer to:

Salisbury Island (California), United States
Salisbury Island (Nunavut), Canada
Salisbury Island (Russia)
Salisbury Island (Western Australia), Australia
Iona Island (New York), once known as Salisbury Island 
Salisbury Island, Durban, a former island now part of the Port of Durban in South Africa, it is home to Naval Station Durban